This article lists the winners of the Manager, Player and Young Player monthly awards in the Scottish Premier League (SPL) from the 2000–01 season until the league ceased operating at the end of the 2012–13 season. The Young Player of the Month began being awarded in the 2001–02 season. The Rising Star awards were issued most months in the 2007–08 season.

The awards were presented by the sponsors of the Scottish Premier League (SPL), the Bank of Scotland from 2000 to 2007 and the Clydesdale Bank from 2007 to 2013.

2000–01

2001–02

2002–03

2003–04

2004–05

2005–06

2006–07

2007–08

2008–09

Rising Star award 
August 2008: Shane Sutherland (Inverness CT)
September 2008: Ryan Dow (Dundee United)
October 2008: Gregg Wylde (Rangers)
November 2008: Ben Carson (St Mirren)
December 2008: James McCarthy (Hamilton Academical)
February 2009: Craig Thomson (Heart of Midlothian)

2009–10

2010–11

Rising Star award 
December 2010: David Crawford

2011–12

2012–13

See also
 Scottish Football League monthly awards
 Scottish Premier League Yearly Awards 
 Scottish Professional Football League monthly awards

References

External links
 SPL monthly awards - Roll of honour since 2000 Scottish Premier League

Awards
Scottish football trophies and awards
Awards established in 2000
Awards disestablished in 2013